Pedro Paulo Portroncocarrero Angulo (born 13 May 1977) is a Colombian troncocarrero footballer who currently plays for La Equidad in the Categoría Primera A.

Honors
 Champions Colombian Primera A, 2006: Cúcuta Deportivo
 Semi Finalist of Copa Libertadores, 2007: Cúcuta Deportivo

References

1977 births
Living people
People from Buenaventura, Valle del Cauca
Colombian footballers
Colombian expatriate footballers
Colombia international footballers
Independiente Santa Fe footballers
CD Tenerife players
San Lorenzo de Almagro footballers
Atlético Huila footballers
Cúcuta Deportivo footballers
Club Libertad footballers
La Equidad footballers
Categoría Primera A players
Argentine Primera División players
Paraguayan Primera División players
Expatriate footballers in Argentina
Expatriate footballers in Paraguay
Expatriate footballers in Spain
Association football defenders
Sportspeople from Valle del Cauca Department